Palaeontologia Electronica is a triannual peer-reviewed open-access scientific journal published by Coquina Press covering paleontology. It was established in 1998 and is the oldest fully open-access electronic journal of paleontology. The journal is sponsored by the Society of Vertebrate Paleontology, the Paleontological Society,  the Palaeontological Association, and the Western Interior Paleontological Society. The editors-in-chief are Julien Louys (Griffith University) and Andrew Bush (University of Connecticut). In 2000, the first taxonomic names published electronically under new rules in the International Code of Zoological Nomenclature were published in the journal by Scott et al. (2000) for three new species of fossil foraminifera: Eggerella matsunoi, Haplophragmoides hatai, and Haplophragmoides nishikizawensis.

Abstracting and indexing
The journal is abstracted and indexed in:
Biological Abstracts
BIOSIS Previews
Current Contents/Physical, Chemical & Earth Sciences
Science Citation Index Expanded
Scopus
Zoological Record
According to the Journal Citation Reports, the journal has a 2017 impact factor of 1.410.

References

External links

Paleontology journals
Open access journals
Triannual journals
English-language journals
Publications established in 1998